

In mathematics 
The quaternions form a number system that extends the complex numbers.
Quaternion rotation
 Quaternion group, a non-abelian group of order 8

Symbols 
 Imperial quaternions (heraldry of the Holy Roman Empire) 
 Quaternion Eagle

Military uses 
A group of four soldiers in the Roman legion
A fireteam

Other 
 Quaternion (gathering), four folded sheets as a unit in bookbinding
 Quaternion (poetry), a style of poetry with four parts

See also